Abolition of slavery in Seychelles was a gradual process that became increasingly powerful in the early nineteenth century and finalized in 1835.

Slavery 
Slaves in the Seychelles were placed in four broad categories. Firstly there were the Creoles (the largest group), those of mixed African and European blood who were brought from Mauritius and had children born on the island; they were often regarded as superior in intellect.

Abolition 
The Anti-Slavery movement in Seychelles led by William Wilberforce grew in power in the early 19th century. The civil administrator at the time, Mylius recalled that on Emancipation Day on February 11 the freed slaves responded with "peaceable demonstrations of joy".

References

Seychelles
History of Seychelles
1835 in law
Slavery in Africa
Human rights abuses in Seychelles

de:Ostafrikanischer Sklavenhandel